A City square is another name for a town square.

City square may also refer to:

Urban park type
 List of city squares by size
City Square, Melbourne, Victoria, Australia
City Square (MBTA station), Charlestown, Massachusetts, United States
City Square (skyscraper), a skyscraper in Perth, Western Australia
City Square Mall, Singapore
City Square Shopping Centre, Vancouver, British Columbia, Canada
City Square, Leeds, West Yorkshire, England, UK
Johor Bahru City Square, a shopping Mall in Johor Bahru, Johor, Malaysia.
Oskaloosa City Square Commercial Historic District, Iowa, United States
Phoenix City Square, Arizona, United States

The alternate CitySquare may refer to:
 The former Worcester Center Galleria, a shopping mall complex in Worcester, Massachusetts
 CitySquare (Dallas), a non-profit social service organization in Dallas, Texas

See also
City Center Square, Kansas City, Missouri, United States
City Square House, Leeds, West Yorkshire, England, UK
Spring City Square, Jinan City, Shandong, China
 The City Hall Square (disambiguation)
 Town square (disambiguation)
 Public Square (disambiguation)
 Market Square (disambiguation)
 The Square (disambiguation)
 Square (disambiguation)
 Piazza (disambiguation)
 Plaza (disambiguation)